Walter Watling (13 March 1864 – 19 December 1928) was an Australian cricketer. He played in five first-class matches for South Australia between 1883 and 1889.

See also
 List of South Australian representative cricketers

References

External links
 

1864 births
1928 deaths
Australian cricketers
South Australia cricketers
Cricketers from Adelaide